The Union Street Railway Carbarn, Repair Shop is a historic transit maintenance facility at 1959 Purchase Street in New Bedford, Massachusetts.  Built in 1910, the carbarn was the center of the New Bedford's streetcar network, which operated from 1872 to 1947.  The carbarn is a large single-story brick building, occupying nearly half of a city block.  The adjacent repair shop building, a single-story brick-and-wood building, was built in 1897; it was demolished sometime between 1978 and 2003.

The property was listed on the National Register of Historic Places in 1978.

See also
National Register of Historic Places listings in New Bedford, Massachusetts

References

Industrial buildings and structures on the National Register of Historic Places in Massachusetts
Buildings and structures in New Bedford, Massachusetts
Streetcars in Massachusetts
National Register of Historic Places in New Bedford, Massachusetts
Historic district contributing properties in Massachusetts